The yellow-bibbed lory (Lorius chlorocercus) is a species of parrot in the family Psittaculidae. It is endemic to the southern Solomon Islands.

Description
The yellow-bibbed lory is 28 cm (11 in) long. It is mostly red with black on top of head and green wings. It has a yellow transverse band on upper chest and a crescent-shaped black patch on each side of neck. It has blue/green thighs and dark-grey legs. It has an orange-red beak, dark-grey eyerings, and orange irises. Under its wings the bird has blue feathers.

Range and habitat
The yellow-bibbed lory is endemic to the eastern Solomon Islands. Its natural habitats are subtropical or tropical moist lowland forest and subtropical or tropical moist montane forest.

Relationship with humans

Yellow-bibbed Lories mimic a wide range of sounds, including the human voice, in other words they are 'talking parrots'. Providing a permit is obtained, it is exempt from export prohibition under the Solomon Islands Wildlife Protection and Management Act (1998)

References

Cited texts
 

yellow-bibbed lory
Endemic birds of the Solomon Islands
yellow-bibbed lory
Taxonomy articles created by Polbot